Brett Newlin (born March 24, 1982, in Mission Viejo, California) is an American rower, who competed at the 2008 and 2012 Summer Olympics. He grew up in Riverton, Wyoming and began college at Michigan State University, but transferred to the University of Washington in January 2003 as a sophomore and rowed in the UW V8+ that spring as the Huskies won their first Pac-10 Championship since 1997 and took silver at the IRA regatta. He repeated both results in 2004. He graduated from UW in 2005.

Newlin has been a member of eight USRowing national teams. World Rowing Championships results include silver in the 4+ (2005), fourth in the 4- (2006), fourth in the 8+ (2007), 13th in the 4- (2009), sixth in the 8+ (2010), and fourth in the 4- (2011). Olympic Games results include a ninth-place finish in the 4- (2008) and fourth in the 8+ (2012).

Personal life
Newlin's sister is Kristen Newlin, who has played women's basketball for Fenerbahçe Istanbul in Turkey since 2008.

References

External links 
 

1982 births
Living people
American male rowers
Rowers at the 2008 Summer Olympics
Rowers at the 2012 Summer Olympics
Olympic rowers of the United States
World Rowing Championships medalists for the United States
People from Mission Viejo, California
People from Riverton, Wyoming